The Estabrook Historic District, southeast of Bailey, Colorado, is a  historic district which was listed on the National Register of Historic Places in 1980.

It was deemedsignificant for its association with the Denver South Park & Pacific Railway and the tourist industry that developed at some points along the line. The District is also significant for its architectural features, notably the excellent examples of the rustic style seen in the Rocky Mountains, and for its association with some of the state's most important pioneers.

It is a former community on the North Fork of the South Platte River which has rustic stone and wood buildings and structures, including ice houses, barns and other outbuildings, which was at the Estabrook stop of the Denver South Park & Pacific Railway.  It includes a small railroad bridge which is believed to be the only surviving original bridge of that railway. It is entirely privately owned property, although nearly surrounded by the Pike National Forest.

References

Historic districts on the National Register of Historic Places in Colorado
National Register of Historic Places in Park County, Colorado
Buildings and structures completed in 1872